Gerber is a surname that is of Ashkenazi Jewish, German, or Swiss origin, depending on the family. Notable people with the surname include:

 Aisha Gerber, (born 1999), Canadian artistic gymnast
 Bob Gerber (1916–2002), American basketball player
 Christoph Gerber, Swiss physicist
 Craig Gerber (creator), invented two Disney animated shows
 Craig Stuart Gerber, baseballer
 Danie Gerber (born 1958), South African rugby player
 Daniel Frank Gerber (1898–1974) founder of the Gerber Products Company
 Ernst Ludwig Gerber (1746–1819), composer and author
 Eugene John Gerber (1931-2018), American Roman Catholic bishop
 Fred Gerber, American film and television director and producer
 Heiko Gerber (born 1972), German football player
 Heinrich Gerber (architect), (1831–1920), German architect
 Heinrich Gerber (civil engineer) (1832-1912), German civil engineer
 Joel Gerber (1940-2022), American judge
 John Gerber (disambiguation)
 Joseph Gerber (1924–1996), founder of Gerber Scientific
 Kaia Gerber (born 2001), American model and actress
 Leah Gerber, American conservation scientist
 Magda Gerber, pioneer in infant care
 Martin Gerber (born 1974), Swiss ice hockey player
 Michael Gerber (disambiguation)
 Mikaela Gerber, Canadian artistic gymnast and UCLA Bruin
 Naomi Lynn Gerber, American internist and physician-scientist 
 Niklaus Gerber (1850-1914), Swiss dairy chemist and industrialist
 Nina Gerber, American guitarist
 Paul Gerber (1854-1909), German physicist
 Peter Gerber (disambiguation)
 Rande Gerber (born 1962), model and businessman, father of Kaia
 Rayno Gerber (born 1981), South African rugby footballer
 Sally Gerber, daughter of Daniel
 Simon Gerber, Swiss musician
 Steve Gerber (1947-2008), comic book writer, co-creator of Howard the Duck

See also
Gerber (disambiguation)
Gerbert (disambiguation)

German-language surnames
Jewish surnames